Oscar and Friends is a New Zealand children's stop motion animated television series that aired from 1995 to 1996. The series was produced in Wellington, and was aimed at children aged 3 to 6. The series was produced by Gnome Productions Ltd., distributed by Southern Star Sales, and funded by NZ On Air and Southern Star Entertainment. Oscar and Friends has been screened all around the world including the UK (ITV) (where the series rated number ten for kids in its first year of release), The United States (Fox Family), Australia (ABC), Taiwan (YoYo TV), Germany (Kabel 1 in Bim Bam Bino), South Africa (M-Net) and Argentina (Magic Kids)

Synopsis
The show is about a 7-year-old boy named Oscar, who, with his imaginary friends, goes from adventure to adventure. In this fantasy life of his, Bugsy, a bright green, bug-eyed mischievous coward, and Doris, a daring, eccentric girl and Oscar's confidante, are there to rescue him in danger and lend a hand.

Production
Cameron Chittock decided to start making his own television programs after years of working for the TV3 Network in New Zealand. He came up with the basic concept for a show about a young boy who was bored on his own at home. When his two imaginary friends appear, they take the boy off on an adventure into an fantasy world. Initially, the idea was conceptualized as a live action show using Chittock's background in puppetry and SFX to create the imaginary characters and fantastic settings. However, monetary issues became apparent as a series based on this approach became budgeted. Chittock realised it was simply not financially viable to produce the TV show in this manner. He then began to experiment with stop frame animation and saw the possibilities of using this medium to produce the action-adventure series. He turned to his friend, and award winning animation director, Euan Frizzell at Gnome Productions for support. They jointly applied for funding and were successful in gaining the finance required from NZ On Air in New Zealand to produce the show. Executive producer Shaun Bell brought Southern Star Sales on board to distribute the series, and invest into the production which allowed the 13 × 7 minutes episodes to grow into 26 × 5 minutes episodes, which the distributor believed would better meet international format requirements.

Although Chittock and a small group of technicians in New Zealand had gained some experience in clay-mation techniques up to that point, he still felt the crew required further training. He traveled to the UK and met up with Aardman animation director Richard Starzaki (aka Richard Goleszowski, who was the creator of the Aardman production Rex the Runt and director of the claymation series Creature Comforts). Starzak agreed to come back with Chittock to New Zealand to help train the Oscar and Friends animating crew. The input from both Starzak and Australian stop frame animator Norman Yeend proved immensely helpful, and enabled the New Zealand team to produce the high quality results that Chittock felt necessary to ensure the series would hold up against international competition. Chittock and his crew went on to successfully complete the series, and in the process set up a small claymation industry within New Zealand.

Chittock experimented with a mixed media approach, because he wanted to create a fresh new look to the show. The joint use of painted backgrounds and stop frame model characters give the show a unique appeal. The puppet characters were constructed using a simple wire armature held together with a brass section socket system. The bodies were made using foam latex with resin cast heads. Replacement mouths were used to create the illusion of speech and facial expression.

Some of the animation was completed on a rostrum shooting the painted backgrounds and puppet characters together while other shots were completed using a traditional model set or against a blue screen. The series was shot on 35 mm film using five hand made stop frame cameras built by SFX technician Stephen Greenwood. The cameras used Nikon still lenses. With a built in video split the animators used a computer and simple line test software to help guide them through the animation process.

Cast
 Drew Neemia as Oscar
 John Smythe as Bugsy
 Ann Pacey as Doris 
 Callie Blood as Oscar's mother
 Peter Hambleton as Oscar's father
 Tungia Baker as Nanny Aroha 
 Rose Bollinger as Rosie

Episodes

This is a list of the 26 episodes made. The show screened earlier than these dates in a number of countries.

Season 1 (1995-1996)
 Oscar Takes Off
 Oscar Goes Flying
 One Day at the Dump
 The Time Machine
 Skullduggery
 Oscar and the Rustlers
 Oscar to the Rescue
 Oscar and the Pirates
 Up, Up and Away
 The Magic Carpet

Season 2 (1996)
 The Frog Princess
 Feed Me
 Chocolate Meltdown
 Eel King
 Oscar and the Runaway Roller
 A Dog's Life
 Oscar and the Haunted House
 20,000 Leagues Under the Rock Pools
 Plastic Jurassic
 Voyage to the Bottom of the S-Bend

Season 3 (1996)
 Starstruck
 Championship Ball
 Oscar and the Castle Kingdom
 Diamond Danger
 Oscar and the Sandman
 Clowning Around

References

External links
An example of an episode

1995 New Zealand television series debuts
1996 New Zealand television series endings
Clay animation television series
New Zealand children's animated adventure television series
New Zealand children's animated fantasy television series
Television shows funded by NZ on Air
Television series by Endemol Australia
Television shows set in Wellington
Animated preschool education television series
1990s preschool education television series
Animated television series about children
Three (TV channel) original programming